The Ahom religion is the ethnic religion of the Ahom people. The Ahom people came into Assam in 1228, led by a Tai prince Sukaphaa, and admixed with the local people. The people who came into Assam included two clans of priests, joined later by a third, who brought with them their own religion, rituals, practices and scriptures. The religion is based on ritual-oriented ancestor worship that required animal sacrifice (Ban-Phi), though there was at least one Buddhism influenced ritual in which sacrifice was forbidden (Phuralung). Ancestor worship and the animistic concept of khwan are two elements it shares with other Tai folk religions. There is no idolatry except for the titular god of the Ahom king and though there is a concept of heaven or a heavenly kingdom (Mong Phi, sometimes identified with a part of Tian, China), there is no concept of hell. It was the state religion of the Ahom kingdom in the initial period.

The Ahom kingdom expanded suddenly in the 16th century and the Ahom peoples became a small minority in their own kingdom—though they continued to wield control. Subsequently, they slowly converted and by the early 19th-century, Ahom religion declined to be replaced by Hinduism. In the 1931 survey, all Ahoms listed Hinduism as their religion. Nevertheless, since the 1960s and 1970s due to an Ahom revivalism movement, as well as efforts from scholars, many of the older practices of the Ahom religion are being resurrected.

The three priestly clans (Mo'sam, Mo'hung, Mo'Plong) of the Ahom people are the current custodians of the Ahom religion.

Ahom system of ancestor worship

Dam-Phi (Dam: dead; Phi: god) is the worship of ancestors as gods and it is performed either in individual households (Dam-Phi) or publicly (Me-Dam-Me-Phi). The dead in Ahom society becomes a Dam (literally, 'spirit of the dead'). They are held in awe (fear, wonder, and reverence); worshiped and propitiated for protection. After the fourteenth generation a Dam becomes a god (Phi) and is worshiped by the whole community. There are three grades of Dams graded according to the generation (with the highest living generation numbered one) and the circumstances of death, and they progress from one grade to the next.

Griha Dam
The head of the household and his wife or the parents are called the Na Dam ("new Dam", 2nd generation), the next higher generation the Ghai Dam ("main Dam", 3rd generation) and the next higher generation the Chi Rwan Dam (4th generation). Each Dam is complete only when both the husband and wife are dead. These three Dams constitute the Griha Dam (household Dam) and they are believed to reside in the North-east pillar of the kitchen, Pho Kam (Assamese: Dam Khuta), which is usually raised first during the construction of the house and is considered most sacred place in the entire house. The Dam Phi rituals are directed at the Pho Kam. The household deity, Seng Ka Pha, is also worshiped at the Pho Kam.  Those who die unnaturally, without children or unmarried are called Jokorua Dam and are not included in the Griha Dam and treated and worshiped differently.

Chang Dam
The next nine generations of Dams (5th to 13th) constitute Chang Dam, the Dams who have been let out of the house into the threshold; and are worshiped according to special rites, called No Puruxor Saul Khua (feast for nine generations).

Chao Phi Dam
This is the final stage for Dams and in this stage, the Dams (14th and above) are considered to have become gods (Phi) and merged with original forefathers of the entire community collectively called Chao Phi Dam. In this class of Dams the two evil deities, Ra Khin and Ba Khin too belong, but they are worshiped with lower status and separately. The Jokorua Dams in the fourteenth generation become Khin and join these two deities.

Gods and cosmogony
It is mentioned in the Ahom Scripture Lit Lai Peyn Kaka that at first there was nothing besides the water of the ocean. Pha Tu Ching— which is an omnipotent shapeless, impersonal god almighty—opened his eyes to the void and thus created from his breast the first deity—Khun Theu Kham. Freshly created, and finding nothing to lean on, Khun Theu Kham dove into the water and then laid on his back, and a lotus plant issued from his navel. This was followed by the creation of a crab, a tortoise and an eight-hooded snake that encircled the tortoise. The eight hoods spread in eight directions. Then a white elephant with long tusks and two mountains in the north and south were created, on which pillars were placed. Then a pair of gold-tinted spiders were created that floated in the air and dropped excrement, from which earth came about. The spiders then placed eight pillars in the eight corners of the wall and spun their web to create heaven. Heaven in Ahom Religion denotes Tien a part Yunnan in Southwest China known as Mong Phi.

Creation of gods
Pha Tu Ching also created a consort for Khun Theu Kham, and Lon Kām (four golden eggs) were born to them. Phā Tu Chin then created a Thaolung to warm the eggs—but the eggs would not hatch for many years. So he sprinkled ambrosia (Nya Pulok) on them and four gods emerged: (1) Pha-Sang-Din-kham-Neyeu, (2) Seng-Cha-Cha-Kham, (3) Seng-Kam-Pha, and (4) Ngi-Ngao-Nham (also called Phu-ra). The fourth son, Ngi-Ngao-Kham stayed back to help create the world. The third son revolted and turned into an evil spirit, though his son Seng Ka Pha became a household deity.

Worshipful gods
According to Ahom beliefs, the supreme, formless, omnipotent being is Pha Tu Ching, who is the creator, sustainer and destroyer of everything. The other gods and the universe are his creation. The Ahom pantheon of gods that generally receive oblations are Lengdon, Khao Kham, Ai Leng Din, Jan Chai Hung, Jasing Pha, Chit Lam Cham, Mut-Kum Tai Kum, Ra-Khin, Ba-Khin and Chao Phi Dam.

Chumpha: The Chumpha (Chumpha-Rung Seng-Mong, was the titular deity of the Ahom dynasty, represented by a relic and which symbolized the Ahom king's sovereignty. It accompanied Sukaphaa across the Patkai on his journey into Assam. It used to be housed in the royal seat, till Suklenmung (1539–1552) moved it away and it played a prominent role during Singarigharutha ceremony.  The relic is said to have been brought down from Mong Phi by Kun Lung and Kun Lai the ancestor of Sukaphaa rulers Of Mong Ri-Mong Ram (Now Xishuangbanna, China) and could be worshiped and handled only by the king.

Other honourable gods 
There are many other Gods including Major Ahom Gods. The Tai-Ahom people and generally had numbers of gods and spirits. They believe that in this world of phenomena visible objects have invisible spirits. Here are some of them.
 Langkuri
 Chao Ban (God of the Sun)
 Chao Den (God of the Moon)
 Chao Phai (God of the Fire)
 Chao Pha Kun (God of the Rain)
 Tai Lang (God of the Death)
 Aai Yang Nao
 Kham Seng or Aai A Nang (Goddess of Wealth)
 Lao Khri. (Full Name : Mo-Seng Pha Lao-Khri)
 Pu-Phi-Su (the god of the forest Who live in the Tun-Rung-Rai (ficus tree))
 Khun Theu Kham Krai Pha Rung Kham Pha but rum Shang Dam Pha Ship ip shang Den 

Scriptures
The religious aspects are inscribed in scriptures written in Ahom language in a kind of barks known as in Xasi Bark. Ahom religion has various manuscripts on Divination, Prognostics, khwan calling, incantation, Phralung. The three priestly clans (Mo'sam, Mo'hung, Mo'Plong) widely use these scripts. Some prayer scripts are known as Ban-Seng were found from Habung. Some of them were brought from Yunnan, China.

Rituals
The Ahom religion is based on rituals, and there are two types of rituals: Ban-Phi that involve animal sacrifice and Phuralung that forbids animal sacrifice. Rituals could also be performed at the household level or at the communal level.

Communal ceremonies
Me-Dam-Me-PhiMe-Dam-Me-Phi (Ahom language : Me-worship; Dam-spirit of the dead; Phi-god) is one of the major ceremonies among the Ahom religious rituals that is performed publicly, propitiating the spirits of the dead.  In the modern times, this is held annually on 31 January. The rituals begin with the creation of a temporary structure with bamboo and thatch octagonal in shape, called  ho phi. In it six raised platters on the main platform are placed for the following divinities: Jashing Pha, Jan Chai Hung, Lengdon, Chit Lam Cham, Mut-Kum Tai-Kum, Chao Phi Dam. To the left of the main platform the raised platforms for Khao Kham and Ai Leng Din are placed; and to the right the raised platters of Ra Khin and Ba Khin.

Rik-Khwan Mong Khwan
The Rik-Khwan Mong Khwan (Ahom language : Rik-to call; Khwan-Life/longevity/Soul; Mōng-Nation), is a ritual to worship Khwan, to enhance or to call back the prosperity of the state or a person. The Rik Kwan is an important part of the Tai-Ahom marriage system described in the old Tai script Lai Lit Nang Hoon Pha. In early days Rik-Khwan Mung Khwan was performed by the Tai-Ahom kings on the victory of a war or the installation of the new kings. In the ceremony, devotee propitiates the god Khao Kham (the god of water) and invoke to restore the soul in the original normal place and to grant a long life.

Non-communal rituals
Dam Phi
The Dam Phi rituals are specific to propitiating the Na Dam, Ghai Dam, Chi rwan Dam and the Jokorua Dam at the Pho Kam pillar inside the house. These rituals are offered on all auspicious occasion in the household—the three Bihus, the Na Khua ceremony (feast following new harvest), new birth in the household, nuai tuloni biya (female puberty ceremony), Chak lang (marriage), and annual death ceremonies.

 Similarities With East Asian religions 
Ahom religion is primarily based on worshiping Deities called Phi and Dam (Ancestor Spirit). Ancestor worship and the animistic concept of khwan are two elements it shares with other Tai folk religions. While the duality of the individual self Han (Phu) and Pu are concepts that probably came from Taoism Concepts Yin and Yang. The custom sacred offerings consisting of chicken and Lao traditional rice beer, both in diluted (Nam Lao) and undiluted (Luok Lao'') forms can be seen in other Tai folk religion too.

See also 
 Bathouism
 Sanamahism

Notes

References

Further reading
 
 

Ahom kingdom
Asian ethnic religion
Religion in Assam
Indian religions